Low vs Diamond is the debut studio album by American rock band Low vs Diamond, released in 2008 on Red Ink Records.

Track listing

References

2008 albums
Low vs Diamond albums